Turner High School is a fully accredited public high school located in Kansas City, Kansas, United States, serving students in grades 9-12.  It is operated by Turner USD 202 school district.

History
Turner High School dates back to the 1920s. It is currently the only high school in the district. Turner High School was formerly located in the building that now houses the Turner Recreation Association. In the 1950s, it moved to a new building that now houses Turner Middle School. In the late 1990s, a bond issue was passed to build a new high school facility. After passing, the new Turner High School was built on a piece of land that was once a farm. The farm was torn down and in 2001, the new Turner High School opened its doors.

In 1958, several students from Turner High School kidnapped two boys from Washington High School in Kansas City as a prank after Washington beat Turner at a basketball game.

Notable alumni
 Pat (Huggins) Pettey, Kansas State House of Representatives 1993–1996; Kansas Senate 2013-present.  Graduate of Turner High School 1964.
 Matt Vogel, muppeteer, voice of Kermit the Frog since 2008, a 1989 graduate of Turner High School.

See also
 List of high schools in Kansas
 List of unified school districts in Kansas

References

External links

 Turner High School

Public high schools in Kansas
Buildings and structures in Kansas City, Kansas
Schools in Wyandotte County, Kansas
Education in Kansas City, Kansas
1924 establishments in Kansas